Mycobacillin is an antifungal cyclic peptide.  It was first isolated in 1958 from the bacteria Bacillus subtilis.

References 

Antifungals
Cyclic peptides